The Shia view of the Qur'an differs from the Sunni view, but the majority of both groups believe that the text is identical. While some Shia disputed the canonical validity of the Uthmanic codex, the Shia Imams always rejected the idea of alteration of Qur'an's text. Only seven Shia scholars have believed in omissions in the Uthmanic codex.

History

The Shī‘ah use the same Qur'an as Sunni Muslims, however they do not believe that it was first compiled by Uthman ibn Affan. The Shī‘ah believe that the Qur'an was gathered and compiled by Muhammad during his lifetime. This completed version of the Qur'an was kept next to the pulpit of Muhammad within the Mosque of Madinah, where scholars would come to transcribe more copies. Furthermore, Grand Ayatollah Abu al-Qasim al-Khoei believed that Ali possessed a Quran (Tafseer) of his own, which included the divinely revealed commentary of the Quran.

However, Shia have been accused since at least the 10th century by anti-Shia Sunni Muslims of espousing a theory that the contemporary Quran differs from what was revealed to Muhammad because it was (allegedly) edited to remove mention of the importance of Ali — the Shia icon and first Shia Imam.  The idea that the Quran was distorted is regarded by these Sunnis as one of the most blatant examples of Shia "heresy".  (An example of a denunciation of tabdil — the belief that the Quran was altered — can be found in the work of the 11th century Muslim scholar Ibn Hazm replying to Christian debating point "that the Rawafid [a derogatory name for Shia] maintain that the Companions of your Prophet altered the Koran by way of omissions and additions".)

According to the western Islamic scholar Etan Kohlberg, Twelver Shia did at one time believe in the distortion of the Quran — and it was  common among Shia during the early Islamic centuries, but waned during the era of the Būyid Amirs (934–1062).  Kohlberg claims that Ibn Babawayh was the first major Twelver author "to adopt a position identical to that of the Sunnis". This change in belief was primarily a result of the Shia "rise to power at the centre of the Sunni 'Abbasid caliphate," whence belief in the corruption of the Quran became untenable vis-a-vis the position of Sunni “orthodoxy”. Among other reasons, the distortion was alleged to have been carried out to remove any references to the rights of Ali and the Imams, the approval of their supporters and the disapproval of their enemies, such as specific Umayyads and Abbasids. According to William St. Clair Tisdall, if such content had existed in the Quran then "Of course the Sunnite Khalifahs had very great reason to endeavour to suppress any such passages".

Shia scholars who supported Qur'anic distortion
Some Shia scholars who supported the view that the Qur'anic text had been distorted were:
Shia author Ahmad ibn Muhammad al-Sayyari (9th century)
Ali Ibn Ibrahim Qomi (d. 919)
Al Ayyaashi (d. 932)
Muhammad ibn Ya'qub al-Kulayni (d. 941) 
Al-Shaykh Al-Mufid (d. 1022) — spoke of the alteration which occurred in the ordering of Quranic verses (ta'līf).
Mohsen Fayz Kashani (d. 1680)
Ni'matullah Al Jazaa'iri (d. 1701)
Muhammad Baqir Behbahani (d. 1791) — who wrote in al-Fawā'id al-ḥā'iriyya: "It is clear from the many akhbār that [corruption] occurred... Our position is that it is permitted to act upon one of the famous seven variants [of the Qur'ān]. The indicator for this position is the statement, or rather the order, of the Imams that "You must recite as the people recite until the day of the return of the qā'im"."
Mirza Husain Noori Tabarsi (d. 1902) 
Agha Bozorg Tehrani (d. 1970)

Many other Shia scholars have held ambiguous attitudes towards corruption of the Quran, such as Muhammad Baqir Majlisi (d. 1698), Mulla Ahmad Naraqi (d. 1829), Morteza Ansari (d. 1864), Mohammad-Kazem Khorasani (d. 1911) and Ruhollah Khomeini (d. 1989).

Tafsīr and Additional Chapters
The Shī‘ah tafsīr on several verses are different from the traditional Sunni view either through a totally different interpretation or by giving the same interpretation, but giving that interpretation a larger impact on their jurisprudence. Shia also tend to interpret the Quran more allegorically (Batin) and less literally than Sunnis. For example, Shia writers, including Ali Ibn Ibrahim Qomi, usually allegorically interpret the term Bani Isra'il (sons/tribe of Israel) as a code word for the Ahlul Bayt. 

William St. Clair Tisdall, among other western scholars, has published on the account of differences in content of a Shi'ite version of the Quran.

33:33

Hadith of The Cloak

4:24

4:24, or an-Nisa, 24, also called as "the verse of Mut‘ah", is the Qur'anic verse that some Shī'ites use to prove the legality of temporary marriages.

Sūrat al-wilāya

Sūrat al-nūrayn 

Sura of Lights.

Misconceptions
There are some common disputed misconceptions and accusations about the Shī‘ah regarding their beliefs.

While Sunnis and the Shī‘ah accept the same text of the Qur'an, some, such as Muhibb-ud-Deen Al-Khatib, claim that Shī‘ah dispute the current version, including that they add two additional sūratayn, an-Nūrayn and al-Wilāya. This accusation of tahrīf "tampering" is antithetical to scholars and is considered polemical.

Shī‘ah Muslims consider the accusation that they are using a different Qur'an as one of the misconceptions about the Shi'a. The Shī‘ah recite the Qur'an according to the Qira’t of Hafs on authority of ‘Asim, which is the prevalent Qira’t in the Islamic world.

The issue of Tahreef [tampering] has been a matter of disagreement between many classical Shia scholars. It has been mentioned that the likes of Muhammad Baqir Majlisi (author of Bihar al-Anwar), Muhammad ibn Ya'qub al-Kulayni (author of Kitab al-Kafi),  Ni'matullah Al Jazaa'iri (author of Anwar Al Nu'maniyyah, d. 1701)  and Al Ayyaashi (author of Tafsir Ayyashi) among others were of the view that the present Qur'an is not the same as was revealed to Muhammad ibn Abdullah and omission/corruption has taken place. Overall, it is claimed that the Shia have more than 1,000 hadiths ascribed to the Shia Imams which indicate the distortion of the Quran.

According to Muhammad Baqir Majlisi, the difference of opinion among the scholars and jurists was as follows:

Some accused Shī‘ah of alleging that Fatimah had her own Mus'haf (Qur'an), the Mushaf of Fatimah, which was allegedly three times larger than the current Qur'an. Again, Shī‘ahs reject this as a misrepresentation of facts aimed at discrediting them. According to Momen Shiite Imams had certain books (including of Fatimah (Mashafe Fatimah) a book revealed by Gabriel to Fatimah to console her on the death of her father) in their possession, none of them were Quran.

See also 

 List of Shia books
 Al-Jafr (book)
 Al-Jamia
 Criticism of Twelver Shia Islam
 Islamic schools and branches
 Schools of Islamic theology

References

Quran
Quran